The 1985 Davidson Wildcats football team represented Davidson College as a member of the Southern Conference during the 1985 NCAA Division I-AA football season. Led by first-year head coach Vic Gatto, the Wildcats compiled an overall record of 1–10 with a mark of 0–6 in conference play, placing eighth out of nine teams in the SoCon. Although not SoCon members, their games against Bucknell, Penn, and James Madison were designated Southern Conference games.

Schedule

References

Davidson
Davidson Wildcats football seasons
Davidson Wildcats football